Humberto Andrade Quezada (born 1 May 1955) is a Mexican politician affiliated with the PAN. He served as Senator of both the LX and LXI Legislatures of the Mexican Congress representing Guanajuato. He also served as Deputy during the LVI Legislature.

References

1955 births
Living people
Politicians from Guanajuato
People from León, Guanajuato
Members of the Senate of the Republic (Mexico)
Members of the Chamber of Deputies (Mexico)
National Action Party (Mexico) politicians
21st-century Mexican politicians
Universidad Iberoamericana alumni
20th-century Mexican politicians
Members of the Congress of Guanajuato